Constantin Wurzbach Ritter von Tannenberg (11 April 1818 – 17 August 1893) was an Austrian biographer, lexicographer and author.

Biography
He was born in Laibach, Carniola (present-day Ljubljana, Slovenia).He later went on to  complete a course in philosophy and published poetry in local periodicals, inspired by the work of Nikolaus Lenau and Anastasius Grün.

At the request of his father, he began studying jurisprudence at Graz, which he, however, abandoned after two years. Instead, he joined the Austrian army and served in a Galician infantry regiment at Cracow from 1837. As a cadet, he continued to publish poems under the pseudonym W. Constant. In 1841 he was promoted to the rank of second lieutenant (Unterleutnant) and transferred to Lemberg (Lviv). At the same time, he studied philosophy at the Lemberg University and in 1843 became the first active officer in the Austrian army to obtain a doctorate.

By the end of the year, Wurzbach left the army and took up an appointment at the Lemberg University library. In 1849 he was appointed librarian in the Ministry of the Interior at Vienna, and subsequently secretary in the Ministry of State.

Wurzbach died in Berchtesgaden, Bavaria. He was the father of Alfred von Wurzbach, an art critic.

Works
He is best known for:
 Bibliographisch-statistische Uebersicht der Litteratur des österreichischen Kaiserstaates (Bibliographic-statistical overview of the literature of the Austrian Empire, 1856)
 Biographisches Lexikon des Kaisertums Oesterreich (Biographical dictionary of the Austrian Empire; 60 vols., 1857–92) A unique publication on a gigantic scale, containing about 25,000 critical biographies of notable personages in every walk of life and from all parts of the Austro-Hungarian monarchy.

His other writings include:
 Die Volkslieder der Polen und Ruthenen (Folk songs of Poland and the Eastern Slavs, 1846)
 Die Sprichwörter der Polen (Proverbs of Poland, 1852)
 Die Kirchen der Stadt Krakau (The churches of Krakau, 1853)
 Joseph Haydn und sein Bruder Michael (Joseph Haydn and his brother Michael, 1861)
 Glimpf und Schimpf in Spruch und Wort (Tolerance and insult in maxim and word, 1864)
 Historische Wörter, Sprichwörter und Redensarten (Historical words, proverbs and idioms, 1866)
 Franz Grillparzer (1871)
 Ein Madonnenmaler unserer Zeit: E. Steinle (A madonna painter of our times: E. Steinle, 1879)
 Feldmarschall Erzherzog Karl (Fieldmarshal Archduke Karl, 1880)

Notes

References

External links
 

1818 births
1893 deaths
Austrian biographers
Male biographers
Austrian bibliographers
Austrian knights
19th-century lexicographers
Writers from Ljubljana
University of Graz alumni